North Island is an islet in Palmerston Island in the Cook Islands. The islet's name is a simple physical description. it is at the northern tip of the atoll, between Home and Tara i tokerau.

References

Palmerston Island